Eli Rubenstein  (born 1959) is a Holocaust educator, writer, and filmmaker. He is currently the  religious leader of Congregation Habonim Toronto at Toronto synagogue founded by Holocaust survivors. He is also the National Director of March of the Living Canada, Director of Education for March of the Living International, Director of March of Remembrance and Hope Canada, and Chairman of the Canadian Friends of the Israel Guide Dog Center for the Blind.

Rubenstein has produced and directed numerous films featuring stories of the Holocaust. He frequently writes for the Canadian Jewish News and his work has also been featured in the National Post, the Montreal Gazette, and on CBC Radio and Television. He was also interviewed for the Polish newspaper Gazeta Wyborcza.

Early life and education

Eli Rubenstein was born in Toronto to Isadore Rubenstein and Esther Rubenstein (née Greenblatt). His father, born in Canada, was the son of immigrants from Tarlow and Ożarów, Poland. His mother was born in Szatmárcseke, a village in Eastern Hungary, but fled with her family to the US in 1941 just before Nazi Germany closed the borders. He is the first cousin of Donald Trump's chief legal advisor and United States Special Representative for International Negotiations, Jason Greenblatt, and the first cousin once removed of anti-war activist Robert Greenblatt.

He attended Eitz Chaim School and Yeshivas Ner Yisroel of Toronto in Toronto as well as Telshe Yeshiva in Cleveland and Bais Hatalmud Yeshiva in Jerusalem, Israel. He received a degree in humanities from York University in Toronto, as well as studying at Yad Vashem in Jerusalem, Israel, the University of Judaism in Los Angeles, California, and the International Institute for Secular Humanistic Judaism in Farmington Hills, Michigan.

Congregation Habonim

Rubenstein has served as religious leader of Congregation Habonim Toronto since 1988, succeeding Rabbi Allen Veaner, who followed Rabbi Reuben Slonim. It is the first synagogue in Canada founded by Holocaust survivors. Rubenstein, along with Esther Ghan Firestone, founded the Habonim Youth Choir, whose recordings of Lay Down Your Arms, Eli, Eli, Zog nit keyn mol, and other songs have been featured in several films.

He has spearheaded partnered programs with many other organizations including Ve’ahavta (for their annual Passover Seder for the Homeless), Sara and Chaim Neuberger Holocaust Education Centre, Free the Children, the Polish Consulate, the Toronto Partnership Minyan, and other organizations.

In 2015, amidst a growing membership and religious school, Rubenstein, together with Rabbi Cantor Aviva Rajsky, led the synagogue in a new building campaign to replace its decaying structure, which eventually raised over 12 million dollars. Groundbreaking took place in the summer of 2018, and the new building was opened in the fall of 2019.

March of the Living

Rubenstein has been involved with March of the Living since its inception in Canada in 1988. It is an annual educational program that brings together thousands of youth in Poland and Israel to mark Holocaust Remembrance Day and Israel's Independence Day. He assumed the role of National Director in 1989 and led his first Canadian delegation on the March in 1990, where he first encountered Elie Wiesel.

Wiesel features prominently in Rubenstein's published works, and he also produced the music for the TV special featuring Elie Wiesel's return to Auschwitz with Oprah Winfrey.

In April 2017, Elisha Wiesel, the only son of Elie Wiesel, accepted an invitation from Rubenstein to attend the March of the Living, where he lit a torch in memory of his father and  delivered a speech to the estimated 10,000 participants.  "It is a reminder to all of us that we are the next generation. We must all pick up the torch," Rubenstein commented, in an  article in The New York Times that appeared after the event.

Over the years, Toronto has consistently brought the single largest delegation on the March of the Living, and Canada is among the countries with the largest delegation. He also currently serves as the Director of Education for March of the Living International.

In 2019, Rubenstein spearheaded a partnership between the USC Shoah Foundation and the International March of the Living. The initiative involves the recording of Holocaust survivor testimony on location in Europe,  using cutting-edge, 360-degree filming techniques at the physical locations of their pre-war and wartime experiences, as well as their places of liberation. The purpose of this project is to ensure that March of the Living participants continue to benefit from survivors' stories relevant to the locations they visit during the March of the Living in Poland.

“This outward-facing radial filming technique in the very locations of the survivors’ personal experiences provides a potent pathway for audiences to experience the survivors' stories",  in a way that words alone could never encapsulate,” Rubenstein said.

March of the Living Digital Archive Project 
In 2013, together with filmmaker Naomi Wise, and community leader Evan Zelikovitz, Rubenstein established the March of the Living Digital Archive Project. The archive aims to gather Holocaust testimony from Canadian survivors who have participated in the March of the Living in very places their stories transpired. In addition to gathering thousands of hours of Canadian Holocaust survivor testimony that currently exists, the project sends teams of videographers to Poland on ongoing March of the Living trips to capture the stories of the survivors as they share them with the students. Films from the March of the Living Digital Archive Project have been shown in Canada and around the world, including the United Nations,  the Canadian Parliament, CBC's Documentary Channel, at the POLIN Museum of the History of Polish Jews in Warsaw, Poland and elsewhere.

March of Remembrance and Hope 
In 2001, Rubenstein and colleagues Dr. David Machlis and Carla Wittes, established the March of Remembrance and Hope (MRH) a program designed for university and college students of all religions and backgrounds. The program takes place in mid-May, and includes a two-day trip to Germany, followed by a five-day visit to Poland.

OISE Affair 
In July 2010, Jennifer Peto, a student at Ontario Institute for Studies in Education
[OISE], at University of Toronto submitted her master thesis titled "The Victimhood of the Powerful: White Jews, Zionism and the Racism of Hegemonic Holocaust Education"  Peto contended that two of Rubenstein's programs - the March of the Living and the March of Remembrance and Hope - were instruments of ‘Zionist propaganda’.

Peto claimed both programs, along with the Canadian Jewish community, used the Holocaust to deflect attention from Jewish privilege, and various unjust acts, including Jewish-Canadian responsibility for the genocide of Aboriginal peoples, the promotion of a sense of victimhood that marginalizes the experiences of non-white participants, covering up of the actions of "racist and imperialist Israel", and the further entrenchment of white privilege of Jews in the West.

Peto was widely criticized for her thesis, for among other reasons, not interviewing any  staff, students, survivors or chaperones  involved with either of these programs, and for relying entirely on internet research to reach her conclusions.  OISE was also criticized as having lax academic standards, for accepting a thesis without appropriate sources. Criticism of Peto was widespread in Canada and abroad, including the Ontario Legislature.

"It’s not scholarship, it’s ideology. It’s totally ahistorical; I found it full of untruths and distortions and held together by fatuous and very flabby analysis. It borders on anti-Semitism. . .I’m appalled that it would be acceptable to a major university", commented Canadian historian Irving Abella.

University officials and others defended Peto, arguing that academic freedom was a critical value.
Peto attributed the controversy to a smear effort by "right-wing, pro-Israel groups and individuals." "This is not the first time I have been dragged through the mud by pro-Israel groups and I am sure it will not be that last," she said.

In an op-ed in the National Post, Rubenstein responded that contrary to Peto's belief that the March of the Living is a "racist" program, " recently published impartial studies show the exceptionally positive long-term impact of the March of the Living on universal values. In the area of commitment to human rights (fighting genocide and combating general racism) an average increase of 89% was recorded since their [the students’] participation in the March of the Living. 87% felt an increase in their feelings of tolerance for other groups after their experience on the program.  These same students surveyed also felt a heightened commitment to their Jewish identity and Israel after the trip, illustrating that a commitment to Israel and to human rights are mutually compatible values."

Interfaith and Intercultural Work

Rubenstein has worked to create bonds with diverse groups in Canada and abroad. The March of Remembrance and Hope program he cofounded brings together Canadian students of diverse backgrounds - First Nations, Christian, Muslim, Hindu, Buddhist, Bahai, Jewish, and others - to study the roots of hatred and prejudice on their trips to Holocaust sites in Germany and Poland. The groups are accompanied by Holocaust survivors and survivors of other genocides, including students who survived the genocides in Rwanda and Darfur.

He is also an advocate for recognizing the historic injustice visited upon Canada's First Nations, recording the life story of Chief Rodney Monague of Christian Island, and his experience in a Canadian residential school. Together with Ve’ahavta, Rubenstein organized an evening honouring Chief Monague for his efforts on behalf of his people on Christian Island (a First Nations Island in Georgian Bay where Rubenstein summers),and for overcoming his traumatic early years. Representing the Christian Island Cottagers Association board, he has encouraged First Nation youth to embrace their culture and be proud of their heritage.

In the area of Holocaust education, Rubenstein has advocated for positive relations between Poland and Jews of Polish heritage, emphasizing the 1000 years of Jewish life in Poland, pioneering Polish-Jewish dialogue on the March of the Living, as well as working to recognize the heroic actions of Righteous Among the Nations, especially those of Polish origin. He has been quoted as saying,“We can debate the history of Jewish life in Poland over the centuries –  and there are many divergent views on this subject. But there is no excuse now for not reaching out to today’s Poland, building bridges and fostering positive relations. We may not be able to forge a consensus about the past, but it is in our hands – indeed our obligation – to create a harmonious present and future for Jews and Poles.” 

As part of Toronto's annual Holocaust Education Week, he has spoken at a number of interfaith programs including ones at the Holy Trinity Armenian Church and St. Ansgar Lutheran Church in Toronto.

St. Louis Apology 
On Wednesday, November 7, 2018, the Canadian government led by Prime Minister Justin Trudeau, issued a historic apology for Canada's Holocaust era record toward Jews, including its turning away of the MS St. Louis and its cruel None is Too Many policy.

Speaking in Ottawa at a special a ceremony after the event, where the Prime Minister, several ministers and a survivor of the St. Louis spoke, Rubenstein praised the government, in his closing remarks:

"I asked a survivor I knew from Toronto what today was like for him.  He said that, “this was the most wonderful gesture a government could ever express”, and this was echoed by a number of other survivors I spoke to.  What a mitzvah, what a good deed, was done here today by our government! Elie Wiesel, of blessed memory, once said: Many people die twice.  Once when they die, and once again when they are forgotten.  So thank you, dear Prime Minister, and indeed all our political leaders, for making sure that the over 250 victims of the St Louis, many who perished in Auschwitz/Birkenau, Sobibor, and other places, are never forgotten, that they don't die a second death."

He also commended  the decision in the Canadian Jewish News, where he wrote: "Let us applaud our country and our elected officials for their ability to acknowledge Canada’s errors and forge a new path forward. Countries, just like people, can perform the mitzvah of teshuvah (repentance.)"

Speaking on January 27, 2019 in Ottawa, at a Library and Archives Canada event  marking International Holocaust Remembrance Day, Rubenstein said:
“I was never more ashamed to be a Canadian, than when I first read “None is Too Many” as a student attending York University in the early 1980s. But I was never prouder to be a Canadian, than when our government issued its apology for this historic wrong.”

Published works

Witness: Passing the Torch of Holocaust Memory to New Generations is a large format volume, published by Canadian Second Story Press, inspired by a 2014 United Nations exhibit of reflections and images of Holocaust survivors and students who have traveled on the March of the Living since 1988 and the March of Remembrance and Hope  since 2001. The exhibit and book are intended to educate a new generation of students about the atrocities of the Second World War.  The book includes an introduction from Pope Francis.  Translations in several other languages are already in the works. The book includes an interactive feature – survivor images viewed through a smart phone, will take the reader to their testimonies on the websites of the USC Shoah Foundation Institute for Visual History and Education or the March of the Living Digital Archive Project.

For You Who Died I Must Live On: Reflections on the March of the Living was published in 1994 by Mosaic press and was the recipient of a Canadian Jewish Book Award.

Exhibits

In 2014, along with Dr. Lara Silberklang, Rubenstein created a Holocaust-related exhibit called, "When you Listen to a Witness You Become a  Witness" which was displayed at the United Nations for three months in early 2014. Through the efforts of Aharon Tamir, International March of the Living Vice Chair, the exhibit was further modified, and translated into Hebrew and Polish, and shown at the Auschwitz-Birkenau Memorial and Museum, in the city centre of Oświęcim. It is scheduled to appear at the POLIN Museum of the History of Polish Jews in early 2017. It was also on display at the Schwartz-Reisman Centre in Toronto in early 2016.

Notable Films as Producer/Director

Blind Love: A Holocaust Journey to Poland with Man's Best Friend, a documentary that follows six blind Israelis traveling to Poland with the help of their guide dogs, to learn about the Holocaust.  The film premièred in November 2015, at a special screening organized in conjunction with the Toronto Jewish Film Festival. It was also featured on CBC's Documentary Channel (Canada).
The Heroism of Hannah Senesh
I Am Anne Frank
Anne Frank:70 Years Later
To Live and Die with Honor: The Story of the Warsaw Ghetto Uprising
Requiem for the Warsaw Ghetto
Lay Down Your Arms
Auschwitz-Birkenau: 70 Years After Liberation; A Warning to Future Generations
Candles of Kindness
Twice Liberated
Czeslawa & Olga
100,000 Souls: The Legacy of Raoul Wallenberg
Without a Doubt - The Story of Franciszek Pasławski
Kindred Strangers - Matylda Liro & Michael Bulik
 7 Days of Remembrance and Hope

Rubenstein interviewed well known Canadian Holocaust survivors for a series on liberation stories, including Nate Leipciger (author of The Weight of Freedom), Max Eisen (author of By Chance Alone), Pinchas Gutter (the subject of the films "The Void" and "Political, Polish Jew: The Story of Pinchas Gutter" and who is part of the Shoah Foundation's  New Dimensions in Testimony hologram project), Elly Gotz, Anita Ekstein, Sally Wasserman, Faigie Libman, David Shentow,  and many others.

Rubenstein introduced a number of Canadian Holocaust survivors to Justice Thomas Walther (lawyer), Germany's last Nazi hunter. In 2015, with the testimony of these survivors at the trial of Oskar Gröning, a German SS member in Auschwitz,  Walther successfully prosecuted Gröning.  Known as the "book-keeper of Auschwitz", Gröning was convicted of being an accessory to the murder of over 300,000 Hungarian Jews, and was sentenced to four years in prison by a German court.

Rubenstein also interviewed Canadian residential school survivor, Chief Rodney Monague (1943-2013) of Christian Island.

Awards

1994 Canadian Jewish Book Award

2008 Ve’ahavta Tikkun Olam Education Award

2013 Miklos Kanitz Holocaust and Human Rights Education Award 

2022 Officer of the Order of Canada

Lifetime Achievement Award 
On May 8, 2018, Rubenstein was given a Lifetime Achievement Award by Jewish Federations of Canada-UIA at a March of the Living Event called "This is Our Legacy", held in Toronto, Canada.

The event honored Canadian Holocaust survivors for their work in educating youth on the March of the Living as well as Rubenstein for his contributions to Holocaust education in Canada over 30 years.

At the event, Canadian Prime Minister Justin Trudeau said:

"I want to commend the incredible leadership and dedication of Eli Rubenstein, who has led this March since its inception in 1988.

Through education and advocacy, he has reminded us of our collective responsibility – as Jews and as friends of the Jewish community – to ensure that NEVER AGAIN is never forgotten."

References

External links

Canadian Reform rabbis
Jewish Canadian activists
1959 births
Living people
Officers of the Order of Canada
Writers from Toronto